Luoyang North railway station, formerly Yangwen railway station, is a second-class railway station in Chanhe Hui District, Luoyang. It now only handles freight services, not passenger services. It was built in 1970, and is a part of the Jiaozuo–Liuzhou railway.

References 

Railway stations in Henan
Railway stations in China opened in 1970